Marjolain Dufour (born November 28, 1958 in Baie-Comeau, Quebec) is a former politician in Canada, who was a Parti Québécois member of the National Assembly of Quebec, representing the electoral district of René-Lévesque in the Côte-Nord region, from 2003 to 2015.

Dufour worked from 1977 to 1998 at Alcoa in Baie-Comeau and was the regional president of the trade union group the Confédération des syndicats nationaux (CSN) for six years and the vice-president of the aluminum union group of Baie-Comeau.

Dufour was elected in the 2003 election in the riding of René-Lévesque and was named the opposition critic for labour.

He announced his resignation from the legislature, citing health reasons, in September 2015.

References

External links
 

1958 births
Living people
Parti Québécois MNAs
People from Baie-Comeau
21st-century Canadian politicians